Simonds is a civil parish in Carleton County, New Brunswick, Canada, located north of Woodstock on the western bank of the Saint John River. It comprises one local service district and part of one town, both of which are members of the Western Valley Regional Service Commission (WVRSC).

The Census subdivision of Simonds Parish includes all of the civil parish except the town of Florenceville-Bristol.

Origin of name
The parish may have been named in honour of Charles Simonds, Speaker of the House of Assembly when the parish was erected, or his family, who were prominent in the early history of the province.

History
Simonds was erected in 1842 from northern Wakefield Parish. It included Wilmot Parish, a narrow wedge of Wicklow Parish, and part of Maine claimed by New Brunswick.

Boundaries
Simonds Parish is bounded:

 on the north by the northern line of land grant at the mouth of Whitemarsh Creek and its prolongation;
 on the east by the Saint John River;
 on the south by the southern line of a land grant at the mouth of the Little Presque Isle Stream and its prolongation;
 and on the west by two reserved lines running east of the Charleston Road and west of or along the Mount Delight and Wilmot Roads.
 The parish also includes the islands in front of it in the Saint John River.

Evolution of boundaries
Simonds inherited a northern boundary that began at the mouth of Whitemarsh Creek and ran westerly along a line parallel to that of Woodstock Parish, which ran closer to due west than today's line. The western line was implicitly changed a few months after its erection by the Webster–Ashburton Treaty which settled the remainder of New Brunswick's land boundaries with Maine.

In 1850 the consolidation of legislation setting New Brunswick's internal boundaries moved the northern line of Simonds more than a kilometre upriver to the northern line of a grant to Henry M. Green and its prolongation westward, a line which also ran more steeply to the south than the original line. This added a strip of Wicklow Parish that included the northern part of Centreville.

In 1869 the western polling district of Simonds, created in 1867, was erected as Wilmot Parish.

In 1870 the northern boundary was moved south to its current location, transferring territory to Wicklow Parish.

Municipality
The town of Florenceville-Bristol is located at the northeastern corner of the parish, along the Saint John River.

Local service district
The local service district of the parish of Simonds comprises all of the parish that is not part of Florenceville-Bristol.

The LSD was established in 1966 to assess for fire protection. Community services were added in 1967.

Today Simonds assesses for community & recreation services in addition to the basic LSD services of fire protection, police services, land use planning, emergency measures, and dog control. The taxing authority is 214.00 Simonds.

LSD advisory committee: Yes, as of 2018. Chair Tena McLellan sat on the WVRSC board of directors from August 2016 until June 2018.

Communities
Communities at least partly within the parish. bold indicates an incorporated municipality

 Connell
 Florenceville-Bristol
 Hunters Corner
 St. Thomas

 Simonds
 Strong Corner
 Wilmot

Bodies of water
Bodies of water at least partly within the parish.
  Saint John River
 Big Presque Isle Stream
 Little Presque Isle Stream

Islands
Islands at least partly within the parish.
 Becaguimec Island
 Lower Presque Isle Island

Other notable places
Parks, historic sites, and other noteworthy places at least partly within the parish.
 Florenceville Airport

Demographics
Parish population total does not include portion within Florenceville-Bristol

Population
Population trend

Language
Mother tongue language (2016)

See also
List of parishes in New Brunswick

Notes

References

Parishes of Carleton County, New Brunswick